The Women's International Boxing Association (WIBA) is a sanctioning body for women's professional boxing came into existence in July 2000, and quickly grew into a major force in the sport.

History
The WIBA was officially founded by American Ryan Wissow, and Colombian Luis Bello-Diaz.
Ryan Wissow is the president and owner of the WIBA.
Luis Bello-Diaz heads the Universal Boxing Council (UBC), an obscure men's sanctioning body headquartered in Bello's hometown of Cartagena, Colombia. The UBC is a separate entity from the WIBA.

The WIBA considers itself a respectable championship organization for a number of reasons.
The WIBA has received praise for their accurate and up-to-date ratings, but the quality of WIBA title fights in inconsistent. A number of highly touted boxers have held WIBA titles at some point in their career.

WIBA has had title fights in Asia, Europe, South America, and the Caribbean, in addition to the USA.
WIBA is very geographically balanced, having champions and title fights in many parts of the world, and giving opportunities to female fighters all over the globe, truly opening up the sport worldwide.

WIBA is also credited for several 'firsts' in the sport.
WIBA was the first to establish a 102-pound division for women's boxing, citing the need for a smaller weight class for female boxers. WIBA is also credited for legalizing women's professional boxing in the Philippines. Women's professional boxing was not legal in the Philippines (despite the fact that the island nation has a strong amateur women's boxing team). Ryan Wissow and the WIBA worked with the Games and Amusement Board (GAB), who oversee all professional sports in the Philippines, to change the laws in their books to allow women to box there professionally.
The WIBA is also responsible for sanctioning the very first title fight, male or female, to take place in Guyana and in Macao.

The WIBA rates all worthy professional female boxers, including champions of other sanctioning bodies.
WIBA also encourages unification bouts with other major women's sanctioning bodies like the IWBF, IFBA, WIBF, and the WBC Female Title.

WIBA's current and former champions include Laila Ali, Jacqui Frazier-Lyde, Ann Wolfe, Leatitia Robinson, Gina Guidi, Sumya Anani, Kara Ro, Chevelle Hallback, Maribel Zurita, Ria Ramnarine, Emiko Raika, Marcela Acuña, Ada Vélez, Anita Christensen, Melinda Cooper, Jenifer Alcorn, Jeannine Garside, Mary Jo Sanders, Duda Yankovich and Melissa Hernández, Sylvia Scharper.

Current champions

See also

Women's International Boxing Federation

References

External links

Professional boxing organizations
International women's organizations
Sports organizations established in 2000
Women's boxing
International sports organizations
Women's sports governing bodies